Freya is a genus of jumping spiders that was first described by Carl Ludwig Koch in 1850. The name is derived from Freya, the fertility goddess of Norse mythology.

Species
 it contains thirteen species, found in South America, Guatemala, Mexico, and Panama:
Freya atures Galiano, 2001 – Venezuela
Freya bicavata (F. O. Pickard-Cambridge, 1901) – Panama
Freya chapare Galiano, 2001 – Bolivia, Brazil
Freya decorata (C. L. Koch, 1846) (type) – Northern South America
Freya disparipes Caporiacco, 1954 – French Guiana
Freya dureti Galiano, 2001 – Brazil
Freya justina Banks, 1929 – Panama
Freya nigrotaeniata (Mello-Leitão, 1945) – Paraguay, Argentina
Freya petrunkevitchi Chickering, 1946 – Panama
Freya prominens (F. O. Pickard-Cambridge, 1901) – Mexico to Panama
Freya regia (Peckham & Peckham, 1896) – Mexico, Guatemala
Freya rubiginosa (C. L. Koch, 1846) – Brazil
Freya rufohirta (Simon, 1902) – Brazil

References

External links
 Photographs of Freya species from Brazil
 Painting of F. bifurcata

Salticidae genera
Salticidae
Spiders of Asia
Spiders of Central America
Spiders of South America
Taxa named by Carl Ludwig Koch